Colegio Internacional e Instituto Superior Parque de España  (CIPE/ISPE) is a Spanish international school in Rosario, Argentina.

Students attending the school may earn two types of high school diplomas/sixth form certificates: an Argentine bachillerato (from the authorities of Santa Fe Province) and a Spanish bachillerato.

It began operations in 1985.

It is a part of the Centro Educativo Hispano Argentino (CEHA).

References

External links

 Colegio Internacional e Instituto Superior Parque de España 

Spanish international schools
International schools in Argentina
Education in Rosario, Santa Fe
1985 establishments in Argentina